Namco was a video game developer and publisher, originally from Japan.

Bandai Namco Entertainment is the successor to Namco and continues manufacturing and distributing video games worldwide. For Namco games released following the 2006 merger with Bandai's video game division, see List of Bandai Namco video games. For a list of franchises owned by Bandai Namco, see List of Bandai Namco video game franchises.

Arcade-based games
Namco initially distributed its games in Japan, while relying on third-party companies, such as Atari and Midway Manufacturing to publish them internationally under their own brands. Later, it would handle its own publishing worldwide.

Electro-mechanical games

Namco proprietary arcade systems

Namco console-based systems

Namco PC-based systems

Third-party systems

Unknown hardware

Atari releases in Japan
Namco released a number of Atari arcade titles in Japan.

Console-based games

Published, developed, and/or produced

Developed only

Published only

Compilations

Ports and licensed games

Other platforms
Namco has ventured onto other platforms, either itself or through licensing agreements with other publishers.

See also
 List of Bandai Namco video games
 List of Bandai Namco video game franchises

References

Namco